The Czech Republic had the second highest rate of obesity in Europe in 2015. 28.7% of the adult population had a body mass index  of 30 or more.

References